Abraham Romeo Seligmann better known as Franz Romeo Seligmann (born 30 June 1808 in Nikolsburg, today Mikulov, in Moravia; died 15 September 1892 in Vienna), was an Austrian doctor and medical historian.

Life

The son of doctor Isaak Seligmann began his studies at the age of 17 at University of Vienna. Seligmann studied medicine and languages and learned Persian in order to read an old medical manuscript for his dissertation, ("De re medica Persarum", 1830).  Later he published an excerpt from the second part of the manuscript: "Liber fundamentorum pharmacologiae auctore Abu Mansur., Epitome etc." (Pars I, II, Vienna 1830, 33), together with a German short version. In 1860 the Vienna k. k. State Printing Facsimile with commentary appear: "Codex Vindobonensis sive medici Abu Mansur ... liber fundamentorum pharmacologiae".

In addition to his work as a medical historian Seligmann worked as a cholera doctor and took up art history studies. Over a five-year period around this time, Seligmann worked as a junior doctor at the General Hospital, while he also moved in an academic circle around Karl von Holtei, Franz Grillparzer, Ludwig August Frankl von Hochwart, Eduard von Bauernfeld, Eduard von Feuchtersleben and Franz von Schober and developed a close relationship with Ottilie von Goethe.  In 1869 he became a full professor at the University of Vienna and he also carried out ethnographic examinations (especially on skulls) – at this time phrenology was fashionable and Seligmann had fragments of Beethoven's skull.  Seligmann retired in 1879. His only son was the painter Adalbert Seligmann.

Honors 

In 1863 he was elected a member of the German Academy of Sciences Leopoldina.

Literature

References

External links

 Short Biography
 How Beethoven's Skull got to San Jose
 Honorary grave Romeo Seligmann at the cemetery Döbling – viennatouristguide.at

Austrian orientalists
Epidemiologists
Austrian medical historians
19th-century Austrian physicians
Academic staff of the University of Vienna
Members of the German Academy of Sciences Leopoldina
19th-century Austrian historians
1808 births
1892 deaths
Austrian Indologists
Austrian translators
Arabic–German translators
Linguists from Austria
Austrian people of Jewish descent
People from Mikulov
19th-century translators